Ovaloolithus is an oogenus of dinosaur egg. Eggs of the genus have been found in China, Mongolia and Utah.

Species 
Oospecies attributed to this genus include:

 O. chinkangkouensis - Cenomanian-Santonian Bayan Shireh Formation, Mongolia, Campanian Jingangkou Formation (Wangshi Group), China
 O. dinornithoides - Maastrichtian Nemegt Formation, Mongolia
 O. laminadermus - Campanian Jingangkou Formation (Wangshi Group), China
 O. tenuisus - Maastrichtian (Lancian) North Horn Formation, Utah
 O. turpanensis - Campanian-Maastrichtian Subashi Formation, China
 O. utahensis - Maastrichtian (Lancian) North Horn Formation, Utah
 Ovaloolithus sp. - Coniacian-Santonian Zhaoying Formation, Cenomanian-Turonian Chichengshan Formation (Tiantai Group) and Turonian Majiacun Formation, China
 O. huangtulingensis
 O. mixistriatus
 O. monostriatus
 O. sangpingensis
 O. tristriatus
 O. weiqiaoensis

See also 
 List of dinosaur oogenera

References

Further reading 

 J.-L. Zhang, Q. Wang, S.-X. Jiang, X. Cheng, N. Li, R. Qiu, X.-J. Zhang and Z.-L. Wang. 2017. Review of historical and current research on the Late Cretaceous dinosaurs and dinosaur eggs from Laiyang, Shandong. Vertebrata PalAsiatica 55(2):187-200
 Z. Zhao, S. Zhang, Q. Wang and X. Wang. 2013. Dinosaur diversity during the transition between the middle and late parts of the Late Cretaceous in eastern Shandong Province, China: Evidence from dinosaur eggshells. Chinese Science Bulletin 58(36):4663-4669
 X.-l. Wang, Q. Wang, S.-x. Jiang, X. Cheng, J.-l. Zhang, Z.-k. Zhao, and Y.-g. Jiang. 2012. Dinosaur egg faunas of the Upper Cretaceous terrestrial red beds of China and their stratigraphical significance. Journal of Stratigraphy 36(2):400-416
 S.-K. Zhang and Q. Wang. 2010. [A new species of ovaloolithids from Turpan Basin in Xinjiang, China]. Vertebrata PalAsiatica 48(1):71-75
 X. Liang, S. Wen, D. Yang, S. Zhou, and S. Wu. 2009. Dinosaur eggs and dinosaur egg-bearing deposits (Upper Cretaceous) of Henan Province, China: Occurrences, palaeoenvironments, taphonomy and preservation. Progress in Natural Science 19(11):1587-1601
 K. E. Mikhailov. 2000. Eggs and eggshells of dinosaurs and birds from the Cretaceous of Mongolia. In M. J. Benton, M. A. Shishkin, D. M. Unwin, & E N. Kurichkin (eds.), The Age of Dinosaurs in Russia and Mongolia 560-572
 Carpenter, K. 1999. Eggs, Nests, and Baby Dinosaurs: A Look at Dinosaur Reproduction (Life of the Past). Indiana University Press, Bloomington, Indiana
 X. Yu. 1998. [Characteristics of dinosaur fossils from southern Anhui and their significance for stratigraphic position]. Regional Geology of China 17(3):278-284
 Y. Li, Y. Liu, X. Chen and G. Zhao. 1996. Dinosaurian Embryo II: Young Dinosaur-bones in Ovaloolithus. Earth Science - Journal of China University of Geosciences 21(6):608-610
 Z. Zhao. 1979. [Advances in the study of fossil dinosaur eggs in our country]. Mesozoic and Cenozoic red beds of South China; selected papers from the field conference on the South China Cretaceous-Early Tertiary red beds. Science Press, Beijing 330-340
 T.-k. Chao and T.-k. Chiang. 1974. Microscopic studies on the dinosaurian egg-shells from Laiyang, Shanting province. Scientia Sinica 17(1):73-90
 C.-C. Young. 1965. [Fossil eggs from Nanshiung, Kwangtung and Kanchou, Kiangsi]. Vertebrata PalAsiatica 9(2):141-170
 C.-C. Young. 1954. Fossil reptilian eggs from Laiyang, Shantung, China. Scientia Sinica 3(4):505-522

Dinosaur reproduction
Cretaceous China
Fossils of China
Cretaceous Mongolia
Fossils of Mongolia
Cretaceous geology of Utah
Paleontology in Utah
Fossil parataxa described in 1979